Andrew Hilary Caldecott KC (born 22 June 1952) is a British barrister and author.

Life 
Caldecott was educated at Eton and read history at New College, Oxford (1970–73). He was called to the bar in 1975 and took silk in 1999. He was named “Defamation and Privacy Silk of the Year” in 2005, 2007 and 2009. Caldecott is listed as a leading silk in Media, Defamation and Privacy in the Legal 500. He is also a writer and his novel Rotherweird was published in 2017.

Cases 
Caldecott represented the BBC in the Hutton Inquiry and The Guardian in the Leveson Inquiry. He has also represented a large number of celebrity clients including Naomi Campbell and Johnny Depp.

Author 
Caldecott is the author of the Rotherweird book series:

 Rotherweird (2017)
 Wyntertide (2018)
 Lost Acre (2019)

References 

1952 births
Living people
People educated at Eton College
Alumni of New College, Oxford
Alumni of the University of Oxford
English King's Counsel
British legal writers
Members of the Inner Temple
British writers
Human rights lawyers
20th-century King's Counsel
21st-century King's Counsel
English barristers